The Voice is a Russian singing competition television series broadcast on Channel One. Based on the original The Voice of Holland, it has aired eight seasons and aims to find currently unsigned singing talent (solo or duets, professional and amateur) contested by aspiring singers, age 17 or over, drawn from public auditions. The winner is determined by television viewers voting by telephone, SMS text, and The Voice App.

The winners of the ten seasons have been: Dina Garipova, Sergey Volchkov, Alexandra Vorobyova, Hieromonk Fotiy, Darya Antonyuk, Selim Alakhyarov, Petr Zakharov, Asker Berbekov, Yana Gabbasova and Alexander Volkodav.

The series employs a panel of four coaches who critique the artists' performances and guide their teams of selected artists through the remainder of the season. They also compete to ensure that their act wins the competition, thus making them the winning coach. The original panel featured Dima Bilan (seasons 1–3, 5–6, 10), Pelageya (seasons 1–3, 6, 10), Alexander Gradsky (seasons 1–4, 6, 10), and Leonid Agutin (seasons 1–3, 5–6, 10). The panel for the upcoming eleventh season will feature Basta (seasons 4, 7, 9, 11–), Polina Gagarina (seasons 4–5, 8–9, 11–), Vladimir Presnyakov (season 11–), and Anton Belyaev (season 11–). Other coaches from previous seasons include Grigory Leps (seasons 4–5), Ani Lorak (season 7), Konstantin Meladze (seasons 7–8), Sergey Shnurov (seasons 7–9), and Valeriy Syutkin (seasons 8 and 9).

The Voice began airing on October 5, 2012, as an autumn-winter TV season program. The show proved to be a hit for Channel One. In April 2020, Channel One renewed the series through its ninth season that premiered on October 9, 2020.

Conception
An adaptation of the Dutch show The Voice of Holland, Channel One announced the show under the name Голос (The Voice).

In each season, the winner receives ₽1,000,000 (≈$16,000) and a record deal with Universal Music Group.

Selection process and format
Blind auditions
Each season begins with the "Blind Auditions," where coaches form their team of artists (12 artists in season 1 and since season 7, 14 artists in seasons 2–6) whom they mentor through the remainder of the season. (There was a rule in seasons 3–5 that coach who complete his/her team firstly can add to his/her team still one artist). The coaches' chairs are faced towards the audience during artists' performances; those interested in an artist press their button, which turns their chair towards the artist and illuminates the bottom of the chair to read "Я выбираю тебя" ("I Want You"). At the conclusion of the performance, an artist either defaults to the only coach who turned around or selects his or her coach if more than one coach expresses interest. Eleventh season features block button which will prevent a coach from being chosen by the contestant.
Battles
In the "Battle Rounds," each coach pairs two of his or her team members to perform together, then chooses one to advance in the competition. In season 1, coaches were assisted by celebrity mentors. In the first season, coaches sit alongside their respective advisors in the battle stage. A new element was added in season two; coaches were given two "steals", allowing each coach to select two individuals who were eliminated during a battle round by another coach. However, since the seventh season (just like in the first season) each coach can't steal artists.
Knockouts
In the Knockout Rounds, a pair of artists within a team are selected to sing individual performances in succession. They are not told until a few minutes prior to their performances who their partner is. At the conclusion of the performances, coaches would decide which one of each pair gets to advance to the next round. Starting with season two each coach pairs three artists into one knockout with two contestants from the trio advance to the next round. However, since season 7 only one contestant from the trio advances to the Top 12. But the coaches were given one "steal" (just like in the previous seasons' Battles). 
Live shows
In the final live performance phase of the competition, artists perform in weekly shows, where public voting and coaches' decision s narrow to a final group of artists and eventually declares a winner. In season one the coaches have the power to save one artist that had not received the public's vote in the Quarterfinal. In later seasons artists were saved by Votes' summa (Public's vote + Coach's vote). In deciding who moves on to the final four phase, the television audience and the coaches have equal say. With one team member remaining for each coach, the contestants compete against each other in the finale, where the outcome is decided solely by public vote. One contestant from each team would advance to the final four.
Addition
Since season 7, alongside the determining of the winner, television viewers vote for the Best coach using The Voice App and HbbTV option in their TV sets.

Coaches and presenter

Coaches timeline

Presenter

Series overview
 

  Team Dima Bilan 
  Team Pelageya
  Team Alexander Gradsky
  Team Leonid Agutin

  Team Basta
  Team Polina Gagarina
  Team Grigory Leps
  Team Ani Lorak 

  Team Sergey Shnurov
  Team Konstantin Meladze
  Team Valeriy Syutkin
  Team Vladimir

  Team Anton Belyaev

Best coach

Reception

Seasons average: Ratings
The first season premiered on October 5, 2012 with a 5.5 rating in the 18-49 demographic. For its average season rating, the show was in the Top 5 at a 7.73 ranking.

The second season premiered on September 6, 2013 with a 9.5 in the 18–49 demographic. It was up from last season's premiere by 4.0 rating scores.

The third season premiered on September 5, 2014 with a 7.9 in the 18-49 demographic. It was down from last season's premiere by 1.6 rating scores.

The fourth season premiered on September 4, 2015 with an 8.4 in the 18-49 demographic. It was up from last season's premiere by .5 rating scores.

The fifth season premiered on September 2, 2016 with a 6.8 in the 18-49 demographic. It was down from last season's premiere by 1.6 rating scores.

The sixth season premiered on September 1, 2017 with a 6.5 in the 18-49 demographic. It was down from last season's premiere by .3 rating scores.

The seventh season premiered on October 12, 2018 with a 5.2 in the 18-49 demographic. It was down from last season's premiere by 1.3 rating scores.

The eighth season premiered on October 11, 2019 with a 5.9 in the 18-49 demographic. It was up from last season's premiere by .7 rating scores.

The ninth season premiered on October 9, 2020 with a 5.0 in the 18-49 demographic. It was down from last season's premiere by .9 rating scores. This is the lowest rated season premiere to date.

Each Russian network television season starts in late August and ends in late May.

References

External links
 Official website

 
2010s Russian television series
2012 Russian television series debuts
Russian music television series
Channel One Russia original programming